Geophila is a genus of herbs in the family Rubiaceae. This genus is pantropical, as it is found in most tropical regions.

The name Geophila was once applied to  a genus of mushrooms (defined by Lucien Quélet in 1886 with the modern Stropharia inuncta as type species), but this usage is now obsolete and illegitimate.

Species 
The following species are recognized:
 Geophila afzelii Hiern
 Geophila aschersoniana Büttner
 Geophila cordata Bello
 Geophila cordifolia Miq.
 Geophila croatii Steyerm.
 Geophila emarginata K.Krause
 Geophila erythrocarpa Vanth. & Dessein
 Geophila flaviflora Aké Assi
 Geophila gracilis (Ruiz & Pav.) DC.
 Geophila hirta Korth.
 Geophila humifusa King & Gamble
 Geophila ingens Wernham
 Geophila lancistipula Hiern
 Geophila macrocarpa (Müll.Arg.) ined.
 Geophila macropoda (Ruiz & Pav.) DC.
 Geophila matthewii Ridl.
 Geophila melanocarpa Ridl.
 Geophila minutiflora Alain
 Geophila obvallata Didr.
 Geophila orbicularis (Müll.Arg.) Steyerm.
 Geophila pilosa H.Pearson
 Geophila prancei Steyerm.
 Geophila renaris De Wild. & T.Durand
 Geophila repens (L.) I.M.Johnst.
 Geophila scortechinii King
 Geophila speciosa K.Schum.
 Geophila tenuis (Müll.Arg.) Standl.
 Geophila yunnanensis H.lév.
 Geophila zollingeriana Miq.

References 

Rubiaceae genera
Palicoureeae
Taxa named by David Don